Lotna is a village in Hilauli block of Unnao district, Uttar Pradesh, India. As of 2011, its population is 2,443, in 477 households, and it has 2 primary schools and no healthcare facilities.

The 1961 census recorded Lotna as comprising 8 hamlets, with a total population of 899 (481 male and 418 female), in 155 households and 136 physical houses. The area of the village was given as 1,300 acres.

References

Villages in Unnao district